Power in the Music is the fourteenth studio album by the Canadian rock band the Guess Who. The album was released in 1975 by RCA Records. It is the last album to feature lead singer Burton Cummings, before he left The Guess Who in 1975 to pursue a solo career.

The album features two singles: "Rosanne" (U.S. #105, Canada #55) and "When the Band Was Singin' ‘Shakin' All Over’" (U.S. #102). The lyrics of this 1975 song reference the Guess Who's 1965 hit "Shakin' All Over".

Release history
In addition to the usual two channel stereo version the album was also released by RCA in a four channel quadraphonic version on both LP and 8-track tape. The quad LP version used the Quadradisc system.

The album was later released on CD by Iconoclassic with two bonus tracks.

Track listing
All songs written by Burton Cummings and Domenic Troiano.
"Down and Out Woman" – 3:37
"Women" – 3:25
"When the Band Was Singin' ‘Shakin' All Over’" – 3:35
"Dreams" – 4:45
"Rich World/Poor World" – 6:20
"Rosanne" – 4:17
"Coors for Sunday" – 4:25
"Shopping Bag Lady" – 5:40
"Power in the Music" – 6:35

2014 Iconoclassic remaster bonus tracks:
10. "When the Band Was Singin' (Shakin' All Over)" (Rehearsal Take) – 4:54
11. "Coors for Sunday" (Rehearsal Take), Medley: "Then I Kissed Her" (Phil Spector, Ellie Greenwich, Jeff Barry), "Johnny B. Goode" (Chuck Berry), "Carol" (Berry), plus a snippet rehearsal take of "Shopping Bag Lady" – 13:38

Personnel
The Guess Who 
Burton Cummings – lead vocals, keyboards
Domenic Troiano – guitar, backing vocals
Bill Wallace – bass, backing vocals
Garry Peterson – drums

Additional personnel
Brian Christian – engineer
Jack Richardson – producer

Charts
Album

Singles

References

1975 albums
The Guess Who albums
Albums produced by Jack Richardson (record producer)
RCA Victor albums